The Elbridge Village Historic District  is a  historic district in the town of Elbridge, New York.  It includes 66 contributing buildings and 26 contributing objects.

Most of the contributing buildings are along Route 5.  Federal and Greek Revival architectural styles are represented.

Contributing objects include items such as a carriage entry staircase.

The Town of Elbridge has an estimated population of 6,000 people and an approximate size of 36 square miles.

References

Houses on the National Register of Historic Places in New York (state)
Federal architecture in New York (state)
Historic districts in Onondaga County, New York
Historic districts on the National Register of Historic Places in New York (state)
National Register of Historic Places in Onondaga County, New York